Kuala Lumpur International Airport ERL station or KLIA ERL station is a station on the Express Rail Link (ERL) which serves the Main Terminal building of Kuala Lumpur International Airport (KLIA) in Sepang, Selangor, Malaysia. The station is located on the first floor of the Main Terminal building. It is served by both lines of the ERL, the KLIA Ekspres and KLIA Transit.

All ERL trains stop at this station and klia2 ERL station. The KLIA Ekspres runs non-stop to KL Sentral, the main railway in the capital Kuala Lumpur, while the KLIA Transit makes additional stops at three intermediate stations before terminating at KL Sentral.

KLIA-klia2 shuttle 

The KLIA Ekspres and KLIA Transit services each operate on two 2 km bi-directional single tracks between the KLIA and klia2 stations. The KLIA Ekspress runs on the track connecting Platforms A of both stations and the KLIA Transit between Platforms B respectively. Passengers are advised whether a service is inbound or outbound through automated station announcements and platform displays.

These overlapping services and shared stations allow the ERL to function as a higher frequency shuttle between KLIA and klia2 unlike the terminals at KL Sentral where the services end and start at their own separate platforms on different corners of the station.

See also
Kuala Lumpur International Airport
Public transport in Kuala Lumpur

2002 establishments in Malaysia
Airport railway stations in Malaysia
Express Rail Link
Rapid transit stations in Selangor
Railway stations opened in 2002
Kuala Lumpur International Airport